F. A. Dry (born September 2, 1931) is a former American football coach.  He was the head football coach for the University of Tulsa from 1972 to 1976. During his tenure there, he compiled a 31–18–1 record. After four straight  Missouri Valley Conference championships Dry departed for Texas Christian University (TCU), where he compiled a 12–51–3 record.

Dry played football at Oklahoma A&M (now Oklahoma State University), from 1950 to 1952.

Head coaching record

Notes

References

1931 births
Living people
American football centers
Baylor Bears football coaches
Houston Oilers coaches
Oklahoma State Cowboys football players
TCU Horned Frogs football coaches
Tulsa Golden Hurricane athletic directors
Tulsa Golden Hurricane football coaches